Yukino (written: , ,  or  in hiragana) is a feminine Japanese given name. Notable people with the name include:

, Japanese footballer 
, Japanese announcer
, Japanese actress
, Japanese idol and singer
, Japanese table tennis player
, Japanese badminton player

Fictional characters
Yukino Kikukawa, a character from the My-HiME anime and manga series, and her My-Otome counterpart Yukino Chrysant
Yukino Miyazawa, a character from the His and Her Circumstances anime and manga series.
Yukino Sakurai, a character from the Candy Boy
Yukino Aguria, a character in Fairy Tail
Yukino Yukinoshita, one of the main character from the My Teen Romantic Comedy SNAFU
Yukino Mayuzumi, a playable characters from the first two games of Persona (series)

Yukino is also a Japanese surname. Notable people with the surname include:

, Japanese writer
, stage name of Yuki Inoue, Japanese voice actress

Japanese feminine given names
Japanese-language surnames